Dictyna foliacea is a species of mesh web weaver in the family Dictynidae. It is found in the USA and Canada.

References

Further reading

 
 
 

Dictynidae
Spiders described in 1850